Čikečka Vas ( or ;) is a village in the Municipality of Moravske Toplice in the Prekmurje region of Slovenia. The village includes the hamlets of Felső-vég, Alsó-vég, and Cseke-hegy. It also has many Hungarian-language microtoponyms, including Alsó-mező, Felső-mező, and Külsö-hegy (fields), Vizköz and Alsó-rét (meadows), and Nagy-ritás and Ritka-tögyes (woods).

Name
Čikečka Vas is also known as Čikečka ves in the local dialect. It is known as Csekefa in Hungarian.

History
Čikečka Vas was first mentioned in written sources in 1208. A school was established in 1941, but was discontinued in 1945. A fire station was built in 1954. The local mill stopped operating in 1962.

Unmarked grave
Čikečka Vas is the site of an unmarked grave associated with the Second World War or its aftermath. The Čikečka Vas Grave lies east of the village, in the parking lot left of the entrance to the village cemetery. It contains the remains of a Hungarian that was shot while crossing the border illegally.

Chapel

There is a small chapel with a three-storey belfry in the settlement.

References

External links

Čikečka Vas on Geopedia

Populated places in the Municipality of Moravske Toplice